Mary Immaculate High School is a Roman Catholic comprehensive school located in Wenvoe, Vale of Glamorgan, Wales. Despite being located in the Vale of Glamorgan, the school is administered as part of the Cardiff local education authority and mainly educates children from the city. Close to 40% of its pupils are entitled to free school meals and there is a growing number of non-Catholic families who attend the school as the Catholic population of west Cardiff has changed.

History
The school was founded in 1963 as Archbishop Mostyn Secondary Modern School, which later merged with, what was then, Cyntwell Boys' School. In 1987 Roman Catholic education was reorganised in the Archdiocese of Cardiff, which saw all secondary schools lose their post-16 education facilities in favour of one united tertiary college, St David's. This saw the creation of Mary Immaculate High School.

In 2002 the school moved to new purpose-built accommodation. In September 2013, the school celebrated its 50-year anniversary of Catholic education on the school site. A mass celebrated by Archbishop George Stack, attended by governors, parents, pupils and staff (both existing and former) along with invited dignitaries marked the occasion. The current Headteacher is Huw Powell who started at the school in 2014.

Period of change
In recent years the school has undergone a significant amount of change which has led to rapid improvements, courtesy the hard work of all staff. The spring of 2009 was particularly challenging for the school when it was identified for closure as part of the local authority reorganisation plan. This was coupled with a damning Estyn inspection which identified the school as "in need of significant improvement". Since this time the school has undergone many changes and a rapid increase in fortunes.  By January 2011, the school has been cleared of closure and shown Estyn it had made significant improvements.

Over the last four years, there has been a significant improvement in examination results. In the summer of 2011 the school recorded its, as of then, best ever GCSE results with 68% of the school pupils achieving 5 A*-C only for the record to be beaten in 2012 with 81% of students achieving the same benchmark. The record was further beaten In 2013, when the school recorded its best ever results with over 92% of pupils achieving 5 of more A*-C grades. Outcomes in 2014, represented a further improvement with another set of record-breaking results. 98% of pupils achieved 5 A*-C and a stunning 60% 5A*-C including English and mathematics. This represents a remarkable standard of improvement from 2009 when the examination results saw only 23% of children achieve 5 A*-C grades and 9% including English and mathematics.

Mary Immaculate has also been the subject of praise from observers, both in the local and wider community. In the spring of 2013, the school appeared in The Cambridge University Student Guide to Excellence where it cited the school's improvements over the recent years. A school described by former Education Minister, Leighton Andrews as "one of the most improved in Wales" has also attracted praise from Estyn by featuring in a number of best practice thematic reports. This involves, the development of skills across the curriculum and featuring in the "twelve school improvement journeys" which provides schools with a framework of school transformation. In July 2014, the school was accredited Investors in People: Gold Award, reserved for only 3% of all UK businesses and institutions, for its commitment to developing staff and growing future school leaders.

References

External links
 School website

Secondary schools in Cardiff
Catholic secondary schools in the Archdiocese of Cardiff
Educational institutions established in 1963
1963 establishments in Wales